Robert Seidel (March 12, 1918 – July 1982) was a Swiss boxer who competed in the 1936 Summer Olympics.

In 1936 he was eliminated in the second round of the lightweight class after losing his fight to the upcoming gold medalist Imre Harangi.

External links
Robert Seidel's profile at Sports Reference.com

1918 births
1982 deaths
Lightweight boxers
Olympic boxers of Switzerland
Boxers at the 1936 Summer Olympics
Swiss male boxers